Grand Duke Nicholas Nicolayevich of Russia is the name of two grand dukes of Russia, father and son:

Grand Duke Nicholas Nikolaevich of Russia (1831–1891), the father
Grand Duke Nicholas Nikolaevich of Russia (1856–1929), the son

See also
Nicholas Romanov (disambiguation)